The 1996 Texas Longhorns football team represented the University of Texas at Austin during the 1996 NCAA Division I-A football season. They were represented in the Big 12 Conference in the South Division in its first season in existence. They played their home games at Darrell K Royal–Texas Memorial Stadium in Austin, Texas. The team was led by head coach John Mackovic.

Schedule

Roster

Game summaries

vs. Nebraska

References

Texas
Texas Longhorns football seasons
Big 12 Conference football champion seasons
Texas Longhorns football